Frederick B. Mitchell, (born July 10, 1948), in Cincinnati, Ohio, is a former award-winning sportswriter and columnist (1974–2015) for the Chicago Tribune. He is the author of 12 books and also the namesake for the Fred Mitchell Award, which annually goes to the top placekicker among over 750 non-FBS colleges in America. The award, handed out through the National Football Foundation, is based on kicking performance and community service.

Football career 
Mitchell set the NCAA record for most career points scored by kicking while playing for small-college powerhouse Wittenberg University of Springfield, Ohio from 1965 to 1968. Mitchell joined future Pro Football Hall of Fame kicker Jan Stenerud in the "College Division" record book after Stenerud had set the national mark for single-season kick scoring at Montana State in 1966.

While teaching English and coaching football and track at Grove City High School in Ohio, Mitchell played semi-pro football with the Columbus Bucks and later the Chicago Heights Broncos. He also often wrote about those teams in local newspapers. He was inducted into the American Football Association semi-pro Hall of Fame in 1999. He was also inducted into the Wittenberg Hall of Honor in 1995 and the American Football Kicking Hall of Fame in 2013.

As a sportswriter 
Mitchell, who grew up in Gary, Indiana, was hired as the Chicago Tribune's first African-American sportswriter in 1974 and became the beat writer covering the Chicago Bulls, Cubs and Bears. He is the only writer to cover those pro teams as a main beat assignment in the history of the newspaper. He became a columnist in the last 20 years of his career and earned the Ring Lardner Award for outstanding sports journalism in 2015.

He authored books with Pro Football Hall of Famers Gale Sayers and Richard Dent, MLB Hall of Famer Ryne Sandberg and the late Earl Woods, father of PGA champion Tiger Woods.

Post-Chicago Tribune 
Following his Chicago Tribune career, Mitchell became an adjunct professor of journalism at Northwestern University and DePaul University, as well as the executive producer for Jordan & Jordan Communications in Chicago. He also served as the community correspondent for the Chicago Blackhawks for three years.

References

External links 
• Fred Mitchell Award
• American Football Kicking Hall of Fame

1948 births
People from Cincinnati
American sports journalists
Wittenberg University alumni
People from Gary, Indiana
People from Chicago
Chicago Tribune people
Northwestern University faculty
DePaul University faculty

Living people